Nicholas Owen Dunphy (born 3 August 1974) is an English former footballer who played league football for Peterborough United.

Playing career
Nick Dunphy started his playing career in non league football with the likes of Sutton Coldfield Town, Rushall Olympic and Hednesford Town before signing for Peterborough United before the start on the 1995–1996 season. His stay at the club was short and only appeared in 2 second division matches a total of 18 minutes. His debut coming as a substitute against Crewe Alexandra. During his time at Peterborough Nick spent one month on loan at Dagenham and Redbridge before Nick moved on to Cheltenham Town, Bromsgrove Rovers, Tamworth, Walsall Wood and Blakenall

References

External links

1974 births
Living people
Sportspeople from Sutton Coldfield
English footballers
Association football defenders
Rushall Olympic F.C. players
Sutton Coldfield Town F.C. players
Hednesford Town F.C. players
Dagenham & Redbridge F.C. players
Peterborough United F.C. players
Cheltenham Town F.C. players
Bromsgrove Rovers F.C. players
Blakenall F.C. players
Paget Rangers F.C. players
Tamworth F.C. players
Walsall Wood F.C. players
English Football League players
National League (English football) players